Janoi Denzil Naieme Donacien (born 3 November 1993) is a Saint Lucian professional footballer who plays as a defender for Ipswich Town. Usually a full back, he is capable of playing at right back, left back and wing back, but can also cover at centre half.

He previously played for the academy sides of Luton Town and briefly Tottenham Hotspur before joining the Aston Villa Academy for six years. He was loaned from Aston Villa to Tranmere Rovers and Wycombe Wanderers and spent the majority of the 2015–16 season on loan at Newport County in League Two before joining Accrington Stanley on a permanent deal in 2016. He spent time on loan at Ipswich Town, before signing for them on a permanent deal in 2019.

Club career

Early career
Donacien moved to the United Kingdom from St. Lucia with his family in 2001 and played youth football for Luton Town. He also spent a brief spell at Tottenham Hotspur, representing the club in the 2010 Milk Cup, prior to joining the Aston Villa Academy in 2010.

Aston Villa
Donacien represented Villa in youth, reserves and NextGen Series competitions. He was a member of Villa's NextGen Series-winning team during the 2012–13 season. Donacien played his first games for the senior team during the pre-season ahead of the 2013–14 Premier League season, making his non-competitive debut against Wycombe Wanderers on 22 July 2013. Donacien was awarded a place in the first team squad and the squad number 32, he went on to be named on the first team's bench twice during the 2013–14 season, once in the Premier League against Sunderland and once in the FA Cup against Sheffield United.

Tranmere Rovers (loan)
Donacien was loaned to Tranmere Rovers in August 2014 and made his professional debut in a 2–1 home win against Morecambe on 30 August 2014. He turned out regularly at both centre back and right wing back for Tranmere over the season with a brief spell back at Villa Park after the January transfer window, the side finished bottom of League Two, being relegated the National League. Donacien made a total of 37 appearances during his first season in professional football.

Wycombe Wanderers (loan)
On 21 August 2015 he signed a one-month loan deal with Wycombe Wanderers, during which he made 2 league appearances before returning to Villa Park on 29 September.

Newport County (loan)
On 24 September 2015 he joined Newport County on loan. He made his debut for Newport on 26 September in the starting line-up for the League Two match against Carlisle United. In January 2016 the loan was extended to the end of the 2015–16 season. Donacien made 31 appearances across all competitions during his loan spell at Newport.

Accrington Stanley
On 5 August 2016 Donacien signed for Accrington Stanley. He scored his first goal for Accrington on 29 October 2016 in the 3–1 League Two defeat against Newport County. Donacien played a key role for Accrington as they won the League Two title and promotion to League One for the first time in the club's history in 2018. Donacien made 92 appearances in all competitions during two seasons at the Crown Ground, scoring one goal.

Ipswich Town
On 31 July he signed for Ipswich Town, initially on loan with a view to becoming a permanent deal once he received his new UK work permit. He made his debut for the club on the opening day of the 2018–19 season in a 2–2 draw with Blackburn Rovers. His transfer was made permanent in January 2019, signing a three-year contract. He made 11 appearances during his first season at Portman Road.

He started the 2019–20 season as the first choice right-back at Ipswich, starting in the 1–0 opening day win over Burton Albion. He started the following three league games of the season, however the signing of Kane Vincent-Young in August saw his game time reduced in the league.
He featured regularly in the EFL Trophy, starting every group stage match as Ipswich finished second in the group, qualifying for the second round as a result. He also made regular appearances in the FA Cup. Following an injury to Kane Vincent-Young in October, he competed for a starting place in the first-team with stand-in right-back Gwion Edwards. He made a total of 19 appearances across all competitions before the 2019–20 season was suspended due to the Coronavirus outbreak in March.

On 10 May 2021, Ipswich announced that they had taken up the option to extend Donacien's contract by an additional year, keeping him under contract until 2022. In November 2021, Donacien signed a new contract with Ipswich until 2023, with the option of an additional one-year extension.

Accrington Stanley (loan)
On 18 January 2019, Donacien returned to Accrington Stanley on loan until the end of the season. He made 20 appearances for Accrington during the second half of the 2018–19 season, helping the Lancashire club secure League One safety.

Fleetwood Town (loan)
On 22 January 2021, Donacien joined Fleetwood Town on loan for the remainder of the 2020–21 season. He made 19 appearances during his loan spell with Fleetwood.

Personal life
Donacien's immigration status made national headlines in 2012 as he and his family were denied permanent residency by the United Kingdom Home Office. Donacien and his family were granted three years of discretionary leave to remain in the United Kingdom in 2012. In October 2018 it was revealed that Donacien was waiting to receive a biometric residence permit from the UK Home Office, which would grant him permanent residency to the United Kingdom, despite having lived in the UK since 2001. In January 2019 it was announced that his Leave to remain had been confirmed, granting him permanent residency in the UK.

Career statistics

Honours
Aston Villa U19
NextGen Series: 2012–13
Accrington Stanley
Football League Two: 2017–18

References

External links
Janoi Donacien profile at the Ipswich Town F.C. website

1993 births
Living people
People from Castries Quarter
Saint Lucian footballers
Saint Lucian expatriate footballers
Expatriate footballers in England
Association football defenders
English Football League players
Aston Villa F.C. players
Tranmere Rovers F.C. players
Wycombe Wanderers F.C. players
Newport County A.F.C. players
Accrington Stanley F.C. players
Ipswich Town F.C. players
Fleetwood Town F.C. players